Christian egalitarianism, also known as biblical equality, is egalitarianism based in Christianity. Christian egalitarians believe that the Bible mandates gender equality and equal responsibilities for the family unit and the ability for women to exercise spiritual authority as clergy. In contrast to Christian complementarianists and Christian patriarchists, proponents of Christian egalitarianism argue that Bible verses often used to justify patriarchal domination in gender roles are misinterpreted. Egalitarians believe in a form of mutual submission in which all people submit to each other in relationships and institutions as a code of conduct without a need for hierarchical authority.

Gender equality
According to Christian egalitarianism, gender equality is biblically sound in Christian church leadership (including pastors) and Christian marriage. Its theological foundations are interpretations of the teachings and example of Jesus Christ and other New Testament principles.

It refers to a biblically-based belief that gender, in and of itself, neither privileges nor curtails a believer's gifting or calling to any ministry in the church or home. It does not imply that women and men are identical or undifferentiated, but affirms that God designed men and women to complement and benefit one another.

Egalitarian beliefs are usually subscribed to by Quakers, United Methodist Churches, The Presbyterian Church (USA), The Covenant Order of Evangelical Presbyterians (ECO), Northern Baptists, Church of the Nazarene, Wesleyan Church, The Salvation Army, The Evangelical Covenant Church, and some Pentecostal churches such as the Assemblies of God, The Foursquare Church, and United Church of God.

The opposing view is complementarianism, a view that holds that differing, often non-overlapping roles between men and women, manifested in marriage, church leadership, and elsewhere, are biblically required. Complementarianism is the belief that men were created for the headship role and women were created for the support role.

Biblical justifications 
All three Synoptic Gospels record Jesus as saying:
 

According to Clive Marsh and Steve Moyise, while "lord it over" implies abusive leadership, Jesus' words "exercise authority" have no connotation of abuse of authority.

The Apostle Paul wrote:

Christian egalitarians' interpretation of scriptures and spiritual convictions bring them to the conclusion that the manner and teaching of Jesus abolished discrimination against racial minorities, slaves, and women in both the church and marriage. They believe that the Bible teaches the fundamental equality of believers of all racial and ethnic groups and all economic classes. They consider overarching principles of the Bible to be that men and women are equally created in God's image, equally responsible for sin, equally redeemed by Christ, and equally gifted by God's Spirit for service and held responsible for using their God-given gifts.

Each of the six times Aquila and his wife Priscilla are mentioned by name in the New Testament, they are listed together as a couple. Their order of appearance alternates in a perfect odd-even equality, with each mentioned first three times. Aquila appears first in the first, third and fifth mentions, and Priscilla (Prisca) first in the second, fourth and sixth mentions. Some revisions of the Bible put Priscilla rather than Aquila first, in Acts 18:26, following the Vulgate and a few Greek texts. Some scholars suggest that Priscilla was the head of the family unit.

Ultimately, Christian egalitarianism holds that all people are equal in fundamental worth and moral status. A significant source of this trend of thought is the Christian notion that humankind were created in the living image of God (Imago Dei).

Jesus Christ did not conform to a mentality unfavorable to women, but reacted against inequalities based on sexual differences.

Illustrative of efforts to institutionalize this notion are these excerpts from the organizational Statement of Faith of Christians for Biblical Equality, a major Christian Egalitarian organization:

History

The first organization whose purpose was advocating Christian egalitarianism was "Men, Women and God", established in the United Kingdom in 1984. The American organization Christians for Biblical Equality was established by evangelicals in 1987.

Egalitarian anthropologies 
Titled in accordance with Rosemary Radford Ruether's work in Christian theology, Egalitarian anthropologies explore varying views of gender equality in Christianity. These include eschatological feminism, liberal feminism, and romantic feminism. According to Ruether, the commonality among these anthropologies is the belief that gender equality was the original intention of God and that it was somehow skewed by humanity. Ruether goes on to point out that the belief in the ideal of gender equality "leaves room for considerable variation in relating this equality to woman's present subjugated state in history under patriarchy." In the preceding statement, Ruether qualifies the need for further exploration into the following anthropologies.

Eschatological feminism 
Ruether connects eschatological feminism to mysticism and asceticism by way of its roots in transcendentalism. Her assertion is that the original human, Adam, was androgynous and that "the fall" was the initial creation of gender. She reaffirms this point in a later article, "Sexism and Misogyny in the Christian Tradition: Liberating Alternatives", referencing Galatians 3:28, saying that through baptism androgyny is restored. Sexuality, the main division between genders, is said to be the root of female subordination. Relationships that are typically rooted in sexuality (marriage and motherhood) place women in roles that are subordinate in accordance with society's patriarchal norms. The path to equality is believed to be found when women transcend these roles—traditionally through celibacy (as seen in the life of Paul). Transcending worldly norms, which the Bible instructs Christians to do, brings men and women to the state of androgyny that eliminates gender subordination; thus, Christianity is intended to manifest gender equality. Ruether says that transcendence is the core of eschatological feminism; women reach equality with men by separating from the world, rather than changing it.

Liberal feminism 
Liberal feminism rejects the notion that creation established the patriarchy; Ruether asserts that gender equality originally existed, but was distorted by historical injustices against women. This branch of egalitarianism dictates that gender equality must be restored rather than introduced. This restoration will be accomplished by economic, political, social, and systemic reformation. Ruether includes the church in her discussion of social reform, displaying its participation in gender subordination. Ruether continues saying, "The Church as a bearer of redeemed humanity ought especially to represent this equality of men and women in its institutional life. But it does so as a paradigm of what all social institutions should become, not as a representative of an eschatological humanity outside of and beyond history." Here she distinguishes liberal from eschatological feminism stating that liberal feminism calls for liberation within society, rather than removal from it.

Romantic feminism 
Ruether states that in romantic feminism the distinction between genders is found primarily in "spiritual" traits. Ruether references a sixteenth century humanist, Cornelius Agrippa, saying that women have an "affinity with divine Wisdom that gives them moral and spiritual superiority." Women are perceived to be innately altruistic, sensitive, and pure—traits that are considered morally superior compared to "male traits." Ruether continues saying that men and women are both inherently capable of goodness, but because of the patriarchy placing men into positions of power, more negative character traits are manifested (pride, aggression, dominance, etc.). Since women are not allowed into positions of power, Ruether supposes that they retain humanity's natural goodness. Romantic feminism contains varying ideologies in itself which are as follows.

Conservative romanticism 
According to Ruether, conservative romanticism suggests that women remain in the home in order to maintain their goodness. Ruether says, "If a woman leaves the home to take up a traditional male occupation, she will straightaway lose this good femininity and become a she-male, a monstrous virago, or will become debased to carnal femaleness, fallen woman." In one survey conducted in 1999, a researcher concluded based on participants' responses, "Even though husbands were not always the sole providers, for the majority of men they remained symbolically so, such that women's employment was nearly always described as secondary, even expendable, in light of wives' responsibility to rear and nurture children." Conservative romanticism opposes gender equality in the work force in order to better preserve traditional roles in the home. Women's innate goodness makes her the ideal candidate to raise children and to support the husband. In turn, this spousal support allows the husband to perform better in the workforce; this trickle effect of women sending good husbands and sons into the world is how conservative romantics suppose women make an impact.

Reformist romanticism 
Reformist romanticism aligns with conservative romanticism except in the reformist belief that the inherent goodness of women cannot be lost by equality in society. Ruether says that this ideology prescribes women to morally reform men and male-centric institutions, but to do so they require education, voting rights, and political power. Reformist romanticism believes that the innate goodness of women is needed in leadership positions to improve the nature of the world. It is also believed that the nature of women is incompatible with war and that under female leadership, the world would be at peace.

Radical romanticism 
Radical feminism rejects the entirety of male culture and debates whether males can be redeemed at all. Ruether says that radical feminists desire a utopian society completely independent from males in which women's inherent goodness is unimpeded by male inferiority.

Criticism

Roman Catholic Church
The Roman Catholic Church has formally opposed radical egalitarianism and has stated that the differences between men and women are not merely phenomenal but are in fact ontological in nature.

In his 2004 Letter to the Bishops of the Catholic Church on the Collaboration of Men and Women in the Church and in the World, Cardinal Joseph Ratzinger warned against a related tendency to see gender as culturally constructed, which has generated "a new model of polymorphous sexuality", which reflects an "attempt to be free from one’s biological conditioning".

Complementarianism 
While Christian egalitarians believe that the Bible portrays mostly egalitarian views, with the exception of a few contextually relativized patriarchal texts, complementarians oppose this viewpoint. As a response to the upcoming of evangelical feminism and egalitarianism in the 20th century, prominent theologians and scholars such as John Piper, Wayne Grudem, Raymond C. Ortlund Jr., James A. Borland, Thomas R. Schreiner, D. A. Carson, S. Lewis Johnson, George W. Knight III, Douglas J. Moo, John Frame and Vern Sheridan Poythress contributed to Recovering Biblical Manhood and Womanhood, in which they discuss and rebut most egalitarian viewpoints, such as the use of Galatians 3:28 to defend fundamental equality.

In 1988, the Council on Biblical Manhood and Womanhood (CBMW) published the Danvers Statement as a response to the "widespread uncertainty and confusion in our culture regarding the complementary differences between masculinity and femininity", directly opposing feminist egalitarian beliefs. Similar to the Danvers Statement, CBMW published the 2017 Nashville Statement, affirming differences between male and female. In its Foundation Documents, The Gospel Coalition confesses that "men and women are not simply interchangeable, but rather they complement each other in mutually enriching ways".

Prominent Christian egalitarians 
 William and Catherine Booth, founders of the Salvation Army. William Booth once said of the Salvation Army's workforce "Some of my best men are women!"
 Aimee Semple McPherson, founder of Angelus Temple
 Gilbert Bilezikian, author of Beyond Sex Roles (1985), Christianity 101 (1993)
 Greg Boyd, theologian and Senior Pastor of the Woodland Hills Church in St. Paul, Minnesota, author of Myth of a Christian Religion: Losing your Religion for the Beauty of a Revolution (2009)
 F.F. Bruce, Biblical Scholar and professor of Biblical Criticism and Exegesis
 Shane Claiborne
 Catherine Clark Kroeger, co-founder of CBE International; co-editor of The IVP Women's Bible Commentary (2002); co-author of Women, Abuse and the Bible (1996), I suffer not a Woman (1998)
 Gordon Fee, contributing editor to Discovering Biblical Equality (2004)
 George Fox
 Kevin Giles, Vicar of St. Michael's Church in North Carlton, Australia, in the Anglican Church of Australia; author of Jesus and the Father: Modern Evangelicals Reinvent the Doctrine of the Trinity (2006)
 Stanley Grenz, author of Women in the Church (1995)
 Mimi Haddad, President of CBE International, (2009-present), Adjunct Associate Professor of Historical Theology at Fuller Theological Seminary; co-author of Is Gender Equality a Biblical Ideal? (2015), editor and contributing author of Global Voices on Biblical Equality: Women and Men Serving Together in the Church (2008)
 Trevor Huddleston
Eddie L. Hyatt, D.Min., author of Paul, Women and the Church (2016)
 Craig S. Keener, author of Paul, Women and Wives (1992)
 Paul King Jewett, author of Man as Male and Female (1975) and The Ordination of Women (1980)
 Scot McKnight, Karl A. Olsson Professor in Religious Studies at North Park University; author of The Blue Parakeet: Rethinking How you Read the Bible (2008)
 Roger Nicole, Emeritus Professor of Theology at Reformed Theological Seminary, Orlando, Florida.
 Roger Olson Professor of Theology at George W. Truett Theological Seminary of Baylor University
 Carroll D. Osburn, Professor of New Testament Language and Literature at Abilene Christian University; author of Women in the Church: Reclaiming the Ideal (2001)
 Joseph Parker, author of The People's Bible
 Frank Stagg, co-author of Woman in the World of Jesus (1978) 
 William J. Webb, author of Slaves, Women and Homosexuals (2001)
 Ben Witherington III, Professor of New Testament Interpretation at Asbury Theological Seminary; author of Women in the Earliest Churches (1988) and Women and the Genesis of Christianity (1990)

See also 
 Catharism#Role of women
 Christian views on marriage
 Christian views on the ordination of women
 Christians for Biblical Equality, an egalitarian organization
 Council on Biblical Manhood and Womanhood, a complementarian organization
 Evangelical and Ecumenical Women's Caucus
 Quaker views on women
 Women in Christianity

References

External links 
 Christians for Biblical Equality, promoter of Christian Egalitarianism

Marriage, Christian view of
Egalitarianism
Egalitarianism
Gender and Christianity
Marriage